Holbrook station could refer to:

 Holbrook railroad station, a disused train station in Holbrook, Arizona, United States
 Holbrook station, a disused train station in Holbrook, New York, United States
 Holbrook Junction, Nevada, an unincorporated community in Douglas County, Nevada, United States